Fahmideh Square is a square in the southern part of Shiraz, Iran where Artesh Boulevard meets Ahmadi Street and Sarv Street. It goes to Shahzadeh Qasem Intersection in the north, Artesh Square in the west and 12 Farvardin Square in the east

Transportation

Streets
 Artesh Boulevard
 Ahmadi Street
 Sarv Street

Buses
 Route 5
 Route 25
 Route 75

Streets in Iran